The 1998–99 Detroit Red Wings season was Detroit's 73rd season of operation in the National Hockey League.  They entered the season as the two-time defending Stanley Cup champions.

Off-season

Regular season

Final standings

Schedule and results

Playoffs
The Red Wings would enter the 1999 Stanley Cup Playoffs against the Mighty Ducks of Anaheim, and the series proved to be no contest. Detroit would sweep the Ducks in four games, setting up a rematch with their arch-rival Colorado Avalanche. Despite Detroit winning the first two games, they would go on to lose the next four consecutively, and were eliminated by the Avalanche.

Player statistics

Skaters

Goaltending

† Denotes player spent time with another team before joining the Red Wings. Stats reflect time with the Red Wings only.
‡ Denotes player was traded mid-season. Stats reflect time with the Red Wings only.

Note: GP = Games played; G = Goals; A = Assists; Pts = Points; +/- = Plus/minus; PIM = Penalty minutes;
      GS = Games started; TOI = Time on ice; W = Wins; L = Losses; T = Ties; GA = Goals against; GAA = Goals-against Average;  SO = Shutouts; SA=Shots against; SV% = Save percentage;

Awards and records

Transactions

Draft picks
Detroit's draft picks at the 1998 NHL Entry Draft held at the Marine Midland Arena in Buffalo, New York.

See also
1998–99 NHL season

References
Bibliography
 

D
D
Detroit Red Wings seasons
Detroit Red Wings
Detroit Red Wings